The Kish Airshow also known as Persian Gulf Airshow is an aviation airshow held biennially on Kish Island, Iran. Its first airshow was in 2002 on Kish island, where 11 foreign companies participated from France, Russia, United Kingdom, Ukraine, Germany, Czech Republic, Italy, The Netherlands, Pakistan, Slovakia and Switzerland. Its second airshow was held in 2005. One hundred companies participated, making the airshow nearly five times larger than in 2002. Because of this success in 2005, it was decided to launch another airshow in the year after. Downplaying U.S. sanctions on Iran, during the 2005 airshow, Iran signed a $980 million contract for the purchase of 25 Fokker aircraft with the Dutch company. The foreign participating countries in 2005 included Germany, Australia, France, United Kingdom, Italy, The Netherlands, Russia, Ukraine, Switzerland, Sweden, Belgium, Malaysia, and United Arab Emirates.

Air shows

No air show is scheduled for 2017. Air show 2018 will be announced soon.

Iranian market

In 2010, Iran's Defense Ministry said it will begin the production phase of a domestically manufactured medium-size passenger plane designed to carry up to 150 passengers. With a population of 82 million, Iran needs to have at least 400-500 new airplanes in the next 10 years to replace their outdated fleet.

See also 
Airlines of Iran
Iran Aviation Industries Organization
Military of Iran
Islamic Republic of Iran Air Force
List of Iranian Air Force aircraft
Iranian military industry
Current Equipment of the Iranian Army

References

External links

Official Website

Military of Iran
Islamic Republic of Iran Air Force
Air shows
Kish Island
Recurring events established in 2002
2002 establishments in Iran